Big Flame was "a revolutionary socialist feminist organisation with a working-class orientation" in the United Kingdom. Founded in Liverpool in 1970, the group initially grew rapidly, with branches appearing in some other cities. Its publications emphasised that "a revolutionary party is necessary but Big Flame is not that party, nor is it the embryo of that party". The group was influenced by the Italian Lotta Continua group.

The group published a magazine, Big Flame, and a journal, Revolutionary Socialism. Members were active at the Ford plants at Halewood  and Dagenham and  devoted a great deal of time to self-analysis and considering their relationship with the larger Trotskyist groups.  In time, they came to describe their politics as "libertarian Marxist". In 1976 an undercover officer of the Special Demonstration Squad unsuccessfully attempted to infiltrate the group. In 1978 they joined the Socialist Unity electoral coalition, led by the Trotskyist International Marxist Group.

In 1980, the  anarchists of the Libertarian Communist Group joined Big Flame.  The Revolutionary Marxist Current also joined at about this time.  However, as more members of the group defected to the Labour Party, the journal ceased publication in 1982, and the group was wound up in about 1984.

Ex-members of the group were involved in the launch of the mass-market tabloid newspaper the News on Sunday in 1987, which folded the same year.

The name of the group was taken from a television play, The Big Flame (1969), written by Jim Allen and directed by Ken Loach for the BBC's Wednesday Play season. It dealt with a fictional strike and work-in at the Liverpool Docks.

References

Further reading 
 Thompson P., Lewis G. The Revolution Unfinished? A Critique of Trotskyism at Encyclopaedia of Trotskyism On-Line (ETOL) (from original article in Big Flame Liverpool 1977)

1970 establishments in the United Kingdom
1984 disestablishments in the United Kingdom
Defunct socialist parties in the United Kingdom
Feminist parties in the United Kingdom
Political parties established in 1970
Political parties disestablished in 1984
Socialist feminist organizations
Working-class feminism